Bombelli is a small lunar impact crater that is located in the highlands to the north of the Sinus Successus. It was named after Italian mathematician Raphael Bombelli. It was previously designated Apollonius T. The crater Apollonius is located to the east-southeast.

Bombelli is a roughly circular crater with a slight outward protrusion to the south-southwest. There is a small interior floor at the midpoint of the sloping interior walls, which is roughly one fourth the diameter of the crater.

References

 
 
 
 
 
 
 
 
 
 
 

Impact craters on the Moon